Helgi Sigurðsson is an Icelandic cartoonist and designer, best known for his decade long work as a cartoonist for Morgunblaðið.

Career
Helgi started drawing cartoons for Morgunblaðið in May 2010. He became known for controversial drawings on topics such as immigration, refugees and Covid-19. His last drawing was published on 14 December 2021. On 7 January 2022, it was reported that Helgi had resigned from Morgunblaðið following editorial requests that he would tone his latest submissions.

References

Living people
Icelandic cartoonists
Icelandic artists
Year of birth missing (living people)